The Sosiai Forest is a forest in Kėdainiai District Municipality, central Lithuania, located to the south west from Surviliškis. The rivers Viešnautas and Žalčupys drain the forest. The villages Naujieji Lažai, Naujieji Bakainiai, Jogniškiai, Puodžiai, Alksnupiai surrounds the forest.

The forest area mostly is covered by birch and spruce trees.

References

Forests of Lithuania
Kėdainiai District Municipality